Viktor Nikolaevich Samsonov (born November 10, 1941 in Dukhovnitsky District), General of the Army. He was the acting Chief of the General Staff of the Armed Forces of the Russian Federation in 1996. He was replaced by Anatoly Kvashnin. Previously in 1993 he was Chief of Staff at the Military Cooperation Headquarters of the Commonwealth of Independent States.

Born in 1941, an ethnic Russian. In the Armed Forces since 1960. After graduating from college he was sent to a Naval Infantry unit, and commanded a platoon and company. He graduated from the Far Eastern Higher Command School in 1964. Graduated from the Frunze Military Academy in 1972 (as a class-mate of future Afghan war commander Boris Gromov). Since 1972 he was a Chief of Staff of a motor rifle regiment and the Chief of Staff of a tank division in the Transbaikal Military District. Then a few years he was chief of staff of a Combined Arms Army.

After graduating from the Military Academy of the General Staff in 1981 he was commander of the 4th Army. In 1987 – 1990s – Chief of Staff of the Transcaucasus Military District, and at the same time in 1988 – 1990 years – the military commander in Yerevan. Participated in the localization efforts of Armenian-Azerbaijani conflict. In 1990 appointed commander of the Leningrad Military District.

A member of the Communist Party from 1960 until the termination of its operations in August 1991.

During the August coup in August 1991, he was appointed military commander of the Leningrad State Emergency Committee, said of the subordination of the orders of the State Emergency Committee and ordered a state of emergency in Leningrad and the surrounding areas.

References
Военная энциклопедия в 8 томах. Издат-во Министерства обороны РФ, 1994–2002, том 7.
Russian Wikipedia

External links
Jane's Information Group, Colonel General Viktor Samsonov

1941 births
Generals of the army (Russia)
Living people
Frunze Military Academy alumni
Soviet Navy personnel
People of the 1991 Soviet coup d'état attempt
Soviet colonel generals
Recipients of the Order of the Red Banner
Recipients of the Order "For Service to the Homeland in the Armed Forces of the USSR", 2nd class
Recipients of the Medal "For Distinction in Guarding the State Border of the USSR"
Far Eastern Higher Combined Arms Command School alumni
Military Academy of the General Staff of the Armed Forces of the Soviet Union alumni
Deputy Defence Ministers of Russia